The U visa is a United States nonimmigrant visa which is set aside for victims of crimes (and their immediate family members) who have suffered substantial mental or physical abuse while in the U.S. and who are willing to assist law enforcement and government officials in the investigation or prosecution of the criminal activity. It permits such victims to enter or remain in the US when they might not otherwise be able to do so.

Background
The US Congress created the U nonimmigrant visa with the passage of the Victims of Trafficking and Violence Protection Act (including the Battered Immigrant Women’s Protection Act) in October 2000. The legislation was intended to strengthen the ability of law enforcement agencies to investigate and prosecute cases of domestic violence, sexual assault, trafficking of people, and other crimes while, at the same time, offer protection to victims of such crimes. The legislation also helps law enforcement agencies to better serve victims of crimes.

Eligibility

Requirements
There are six legal requirements for U nonimmigrant status:

 The applicant must have been a victim of a qualifying criminal activity.
 The applicant must have suffered substantial physical or mental abuse as a result of having been a victim of these criminal activities.
 The applicant must have information concerning that criminal activity.
 The applicant must have been helpful, is being helpful, or is likely to be helpful in the investigation or prosecution of the crime.
 The criminal activity occurred in the United States or violated U.S. laws.
 The applicant is admissible to the United States under current U.S. immigration laws and regulations; those who are not admissible may apply for a waiver.

Qualifying criminal activity
Crimes whose victims may qualify for U nonimmigrant status include:

 Abduction
 Abusive sexual contact
 Blackmail
 Domestic violence
 Extortion
 False imprisonment
 Female genital mutilation
 Felonious assault
 Fraud in foreign labor contracting
 Hostage
 Incest
 Involuntary servitude
 Manslaughter
 Murder
 Obstruction of justice
 Peonage
 Perjury
 Prostitution
 Rape
 Sexual assault
 Sexual exploitation
 Slave trade
 Stalking
 Torture
 Trafficking
 Witness tampering
 Unlawful criminal restraint
 Other related crimes, including attempt, conspiracy, or solicitation of any of these offenses, or similar activity where the elements of the crime are substantially similar.

Certification of helpfulness
A petition for U nonimmigrant status must also contain a certification of helpfulness in the form of a U Nonimmigrant Status Certification (Form I-918, Supplement B) from a certifying law enforcement agency.  This document demonstrates the petitioner "has been helpful, is being helpful, or is likely to be helpful" in the investigation or prosecution of the criminal activity.

The government entities which are considered "certifying agencies" for the purpose of a U visa application include federal, state or local law enforcement agencies, prosecutors, and judges, as well as child protective services, the Equal Employment Opportunity Commission, and the Department of Labor.

U visa-based adjustment of status: obtaining a green card/lawful permanent residence
After three years of continuous physical presence in the United States while in U nonimmigrant status, a U visa holder may be eligible to adjust status and become a lawful permanent resident if certain requirements are met.

An applicant for U visa-based adjustment of status must still be in valid U status at the time he or she files the Form I-485, which is the date on which U.S. Citizenship and Immigration Services (USCIS) receives the properly-completed application.

With the completed and signed Form I-485, Application to Register Permanent Residence or Adjust Status, applicants must submit:

 Evidence to show the applicant's approval as a U nonimmigrant;
 A complete Form I-693, Report of Medical Examination and Vaccination Record, signed and filled out by a designated civil surgeon;
 The applicant's birth certificate and a complete certified English translation of the birth certificate if it is not in English;
 Copies of all pages of all passports (and/or other travel documents) the applicant has had that have been valid at any time while he or she has been in U status, or an explanation regarding why the passport(s) are unavailable or lacking;
 A self-affidavit by the applicant himself or herself attesting to three years of continuous physical presence in the United States since being admitted as a U nonimmigrant and listing the dates of any departures from and arrivals to the United States while in U status;
 Evidence to show at least three years of continuous physical presence since being admitted as a U nonimmigrant;
 Evidence that the applicant has not unreasonably refused to provide assistance in a criminal investigation or prosecution;
 Evidence to show that discretionary adjustment of status is merited based on humanitarian grounds/family unity/public interest; and
 Evidence of relationship to the U-1 principal (if applying to adjust status as the derivative family member of a U-1).

Types of U-visas
The specific types of U-visas are:

 U-1 visas - for persons who were crime victims and fit the other criteria
 U-2 visas - spouses of U-1 applicants
 U-3 visas - children of U-1 applicants
 U-4 visas - parents of U-1 applicants who are unmarried and under 21
 U-5 visas - minor siblings of U-1 applicants who are unmarried and under 21

Impediments to issue
As of January 2016, there is a backlog of 64,000 requested U-visas, but only 10,000 U-1 visas can be issued per year. (There is no limit on the number of "derivative" U visas—U visas other than U-1.)  Some police departments do not certify any applicants as cooperating, either for political reasons or due to confusion over the law, though in some jurisdictions like California and New York City, there are laws or policies which require prompt certification of anyone eligible.

Incidents
Abuse of this visa has been attempted by groups who have tried to pull cons or hoaxes on law enforcement in order to qualify for the visa. A major incident occurred in Seattle during October 2019. A group of ten staged a hostile takeover of a restaurant. Two members of the group posed as robbers wearing masks and tying up the other people to make it look as though a crime had been committed.

Statistics

Number of visas issued by year 
Although the U status was created in October 2000, the first visas based on this status were issued in Fiscal Year 2009. In the table below includes data from fiscal years, so for instance the year 2009 refers to the period from October 1, 2008 to September 30, 2009. Note that this only counts U visas issued at embassies and consulates outside the United States, and does not include people who changed non-immigrant status to U status within the United States (through Form I-918).

References

 Attribution

External links
U Visa Law Enforcement Certification Resource Guide from the United States Department of Homeland Security
I-918, Petition for U Nonimmigrant Status - all forms and instructions required for filing

United States visas by type
United States criminal investigation law